The 2014–15 FAW Women's Cup is the 23rd season of Wales' national women's association football knock-out competition. 30 teams took part in the competition. Cardiff Met. Ladies F.C. were the defending champions.

Format
Play is a straight knock-out. First two rounds are drawn on a regional basis. Both finalists from last season receive a bye to the second round.

Results

First round
Drawn on 21 August 2014. Played on 19 October 2014. Hafren United, Cambrian & Clydach, Llanyrafon Ladies and Caerphilly Castle withdraw.

Second round
Cardiff Met. and Swansea City are joined by 14 winners from the first round. Played 16 November 2014.

Quarter-finals
Played on 15 February 2015. Three non Premier League teams remain, Denbigh, Cyncoed and Pontypridd.

Semi-finals
Draw held on 16 February 2015. Games will be played at a neutral venue on 22 March 2015.

Final

References

External links
Cup at faw.org.uk
Cup  at welshpremier.co.uk

FAW Women's Cup
Cup
Women